Morrone del Sannio is a comune (municipality) in the Province of Campobasso in the Italian region Molise, located about  northeast of Campobasso.

Geography
Morrone del Sannio borders the following municipalities: Campolieto, Casacalenda, Castelbottaccio, Castellino del Biferno, Lucito, Lupara, Provvidenti, Ripabottoni.

Main sights
 Remains of a Roman villa and of the abbey of Casalpiano
 15th century convent of St. Nazarius
 Church of Santa Maria Maggiore (18th century)

References

External links

 Official website

Cities and towns in Molise